Lin Chun-yu (born 20 February 1950) is a Taiwanese athlete. She competed in the women's long jump at the 1968 Summer Olympics and the 1972 Summer Olympics.

References

External links
 

1950 births
Living people
Athletes (track and field) at the 1968 Summer Olympics
Athletes (track and field) at the 1972 Summer Olympics
Taiwanese female long jumpers
Taiwanese female sprinters
Taiwanese pentathletes
Olympic athletes of Taiwan
Place of birth missing (living people)
Asian Games medalists in athletics (track and field)
Asian Games silver medalists for Chinese Taipei
Asian Games bronze medalists for Chinese Taipei
Athletes (track and field) at the 1970 Asian Games
Medalists at the 1970 Asian Games